Tombstone Territory is an American Western series starring Pat Conway and Richard Eastham. The series' first two seasons aired on ABC from 1957 to 1959. The first season was sponsored by Bristol-Myers (consumer products) and the second season by Lipton (tea/soup) and Philip Morris (Marlboro cigarettes). The third and final season aired in syndication from 1959 until 1960. The program was produced by Ziv Television.

Overview
This program took place in the boom town of Tombstone, Arizona Territory, one of the Old West's most notorious towns and the site of the shootout known as the Gunfight at the O.K. Corral. Located south of Tucson, Tombstone was then known by the sobriquet "the town too tough to die." The program's theme song, "Whistle Me Up a Memory", was written by William M. Backer and performed by Jimmy Blaine.

The series did not deal with real characters in the history of Tombstone in the 1880s, such as Wyatt Earp, Doc Holliday, or the Clanton gang, with the exception of Curly Bill Brocius who appeared in the first season. It was about fictional characters in the American Southwest. The first episode opens, according to the narrator, on August 4, 1881. Conway played Sheriff Clay Hollister. Eastham, the only other actor besides Conway to appear in all the episodes, played Harris Claibourne, editor of The Tombstone Epitaph (an actual newspaper that still exists in limited form). Eastham, originally a singer in opera and on Broadway, also narrated the series in a deep baritone voice, describing each episode as an actual report from the newspaper's archives.

Gerald Mohr played Doc Holliday in the first-season Tombstone Territory episode titled "Doc Holliday in Durango", initially broadcast in 1958. The previous year, Mohr had portrayed Holliday in an episode of Maverick titled "The Quick and the Dead" starring James Garner and Marie Windsor. Mohr's version of Holliday was identical in both series.

The ending credits indicate, "This series is produced with the full cooperation of Clayton A. Smith, Editor of the TOMBSTONE EPITAPH'' and D'Estell Iszard, Historian".

Cast
 Pat Conway as Sheriff Clay Hollister
 Richard Eastham as Harris Clayton Claibourne, editor
 Gilman Rankin starred as Deputy Charlie Riggs in eight episodes, only appearing in the first season.

Recurring
 Robert Foulk appeared as Curly Bill Brocius.
 Quentin Sondergaard was cast as Deputy Sheriff Quint in 11 episodes of the two later seasons.
 Dennis Moore appeared as "Deputy" in five segments.
 Robert J. Wilke, John Doucette, and Warren Oates all appeared three times, as Burt Foster, Apache Chief Geronimo, and Bob Pickett, respectively, as well as occasional other roles.

Guest stars

 Fred Aldrich
 Lee Allen
 John Anderson
 Rayford Barnes
 James Best
 Peter Breck
 Diane Brewster
 Harry Carey Jr.
 John Carradine
 Anthony Caruso
 Lon Chaney Jr.
 James Coburn
 Fred Coby
 Russ Conway
 Elisha Cook Jr.
 Don Devlin
 Angie Dickinson
 John Doucette
 Andrew Duggan
 Jack Elam
 Bill Erwin
 Margaret Field
 Constance Ford
 Bruce Gordon
 Leo Gordon
 Dabbs Greer
 Virginia Gregg
 Raymond Guth
 Herman Hack
 Ron Hagerthy
 Alan Hale Jr.
 Allison Hayes
 Ron Hayes
 Myron Healey
 Thomas Browne Henry
 Ed Hinton
 Bern Hoffman
 Rodolfo Hoyos Jr.
 Don Kennedy
 Douglas Kennedy
 Brett King
 Wright King

 Ethan Laidlaw
 Michael Landon
 Keith Larsen
 Harry Lauter
 Karl Lukas
 Herbert Lytton
 Ken Mayer
 Patrick McVey
 Tyler McVey
 Joyce Meadows
 Jan Merlin
 Gerald Mohr
 Donald Murphy
 Anna Navarro
 Ed Nelson
 Leonard Nimoy
 Jimmy Noel
 Kathleen Nolan
 Warren Oates
 Larry Pennell
 Joe Ploski
 Mala Powers
 Andrew Prine
 Denver Pyle - appeared in “Crime Epidemic” as Will Gunther
 Mike Ragan
 Rhodes Reason
 Richard Reeves
 Paul Richards
 Pernell Roberts
 Bing Russell
 Milan Smith
 Fay Spain
 Guy Stockwell
 Liam Sullivan
 Ralph Taeger
 Kent Taylor
 Regis Toomey
 Brad Trumbull
 Lee Van Cleef
 John Vivyan
 Patrick Waltz
 Peter Whitney
 Tony Young

Episode list

Season 1 (1957–58)

Season 2 (1959)

Season 3 (1959–60)

Release

Home media
On April 2, 2013, Timeless Media Group released season 1 on DVD in Region 1.

As of late 2014,The complete series of all 91 episodes has been released on DVD.

Syndication
As of 2022, reruns of the show are aired daily on GritTV as a part of its daytime schedule.

Merchandising
The TV show was also adapted into a comic book by Dan Spiegle, distributed by Dell Comics.

References

External links

1957 American television series debuts
1960 American television series endings
Fiction set in 1881
Television series set in the 1880s
American Broadcasting Company original programming
Black-and-white American television shows
English-language television shows
First-run syndicated television programs in the United States
Television series by MGM Television
Television shows set in Tombstone, Arizona
1950s Western (genre) television series
Television shows adapted into comics
1960s Western (genre) television series